Capparis pyrifolia is a species of climbing shrub in the family Capparaceae.  The recorded distribution includes Indo-China and Malesia.  It may be called cáp lá xá xị (cáp có múi) in Vietnam.  No subspecies are listed in the Catalogue of Life.

References 

pyrifolia
Flora of Indo-China
Taxa named by Jean-Baptiste Lamarck